NewsLeecher is a binary Usenet client for the Microsoft Windows operating system that launched in 2002.

See also
List of Usenet newsreaders
Comparison of Usenet newsreaders

References

External links

Usenet clients
2004 software